Richeldis de Faverches, also known as Rychold, was a devout English Catholic noblewoman who is credited with establishing the original shrine of Our Lady of Walsingham. The story of the vision of "Rychold" was recounted in the 15th century in "The Foundation of the Chapel of Walsingham" (ca. 1485, also known as the "Pynson Ballad"), published by Richard Pynson. The reputed appearance of the Virgin Mary to Richeldis is one of the earliest Marian apparitions.

Traditional account
According to Roman Catholic and Anglo-Catholic belief, Richeldis wished to do something special to honour the Blessed Virgin Mary and in 1061 had a series of three visions in which the Virgin Mary appeared to her. In these visions Richeldis was shown the house of the Annunciation in Nazareth and was requested to build a replica of the house in Walsingham as a place of pilgrimage where people could honour the Virgin Mary. Mary is said to have promised, "Whoever seeks my help there will not go away empty-handed."

According to tradition, there were early construction problems. One night, Richeldis heard singing and went out to her garden where she found that the little house had been completed about two hundred yards from the site of the original construction. Richeldis saw what she took to be angels leaving the now completed building. The original Holy House was a simple wooden structure measuring approximately 24 ft. by 13 ft., with four small turrets and a central tower. The 'Holy House' was later encased in stone to protect it from the elements.

Based upon a review of relevant documents, historian J.C. Dickinson (1959) posits a later date for the foundation of the shrine, sometime between 1130 and 1153, the founding of the nearby priory. The Richeldis identified by J.C. Dickinson died in 1145, leaving her estate to her son. Before leaving to join the Second Crusade, Lord Geoffrey de Faverches had left the Holy House and its grounds to his chaplain, Edwin, to establish a religious order to care for the chapel of Our Lady of Walsingham. As travelling abroad became more difficult during the time of the Crusades, Walsingham became a place of pilgrimage, ranking alongside Jerusalem, Rome and Santiago de Compostella.

The historian Henrietta Leyser also rejects the date of 1061, arguing that Richeldis flourished around 1130 and the family is not recorded in the Domesday Book as landowners in the area.

References

External links

Gapen, George Ben. "Our Lady of Walsingham: an Orthodox Introduction", 2002 "(dead link as of 15 January 2021)"

English Roman Catholics
Medieval English nobility
Marian visionaries
Anglo-Catholicism
Christianity in Anglo-Saxon England
History of Catholicism in the United Kingdom
History of the Church of England
People from Walsingham